Benjamin Bennett may refer to:
 Benjamin Bennett (governor), Governor of Bermuda, 1701–1713
 Benjamin Bennett (politician) (1872–1939), Australian politician
 Benjamin Bennett (writer) (1904–1985), South African crime writer
 Benjamin Bennett, an artist who performs Sitting and Smiling

See also
 Benjamin Bennet (disambiguation)